
Pau Rigalt i Fargas (Spanish: Pablo Rigalt y Fargas; 1778, Barcelona – 1845, Barcelona) was a Catalan painter and scenographer. He was one of the pioneers of Neoclassicism in Catalonia.

Biography 
Later, he completed his training in Madrid. During the Peninsular War, he lived in Vilanova i la Geltrú, where he performed decorative work at several homes; notably one belonging to the Llopis de Sitges family, which has since become the Can Llopis Romanticism Museum.

In 1816, back in Barcelona, he began working at the Teatre de la Santa Creu, where he had been appointed Director of decorations and stage machinery. In 1821, he left Barcelona again, due to an epidemic of yellow fever, went to Manlleu, and painted some sets for a theater in Torelló. In 1825, he was named to replace  as a Professor of drawing at La Llotja. He was also commissioned to decorate the school building.

A few of his works may be seen at the Museu Nacional d'Art de Catalunya. Some drawings are in the collection of the art critic Raimon Casellas.

His son, Lluís Rigalt, also became a well-known painter.

References

Further reading 
 DDAA; La col·lecció Raimon Casellas (exhibition catalog), 1992, Publicacions del Mnac/ Museo del Prado

External links

1778 births
1845 deaths
Painters from Catalonia
Scenographers
Painters from Barcelona